The SS Bremen, later renamed Constantinople and then King Alexander, was a German Barbarossa class ocean liner commissioned in 1897 by Norddeutscher Lloyd.

History
The SS Bremen was  built by F. Schichau of Danzig for the Norddeutscher-Lloyd line. She started her maiden voyage on 5 June 1897, traveling from Bremen to New York with a stopover at Southampton. In addition to the transatlantic run she also sailed from Bremen to Australia via the Suez Canal.

On 30 June 1900, she was badly damaged in a dockside fire at the NDL pier in Hoboken, New Jersey. The fire was started by spontaneous combustion of a bale of cotton. The Lloyd ships SS Kaiser Wilhelm der Grosse, SS Saale and SS Main were also damaged in the fire, with the SS Saale sinking, whilst the Bremen ran aground. She reentered service in October 1901.

On 20 April 1912, while sailing from Bremen to New York City, SS Bremen passed through the debris field left by the sinking of the RMS Titanic. A Bohemian passenger named Stephen Rehorek photographed an iceberg that matched eyewitness descriptions and sketches that had been given about the iceberg that Titanic struck. In addition, passengers and crew reported seeing hundreds of bodies floating in the water as well as many deck chairs and pieces of wood. Since there was already a ship specially chartered by White Star line to retrieve any bodies, the Bremen did not stop to recover any.

Bremen was laid up during World War I. After the war she was given to the British P&O line as part of the war reparations. Two years later she was sold to the Byron S.S. Co. and renamed Constantinople, and operated on the Piraeus-New York City route. By 1924, she was renamed King Alexander. She was scrapped in 1929.

References

Bibliography
 1858-Today: Six Passenger Ships called 'Bremen'
 Ship Descriptions - B - theshipslist.com
 National Greek Line - Byron SS Co. - theshipslist.com

Citations

External links 
 
 A painting of SS Bremen

Barbarossa-class ocean liners
Ships of Norddeutscher Lloyd
Passenger ships of the United Kingdom
1896 ships
Ships built in Danzig
Ships built by Schichau
Maritime incidents in 1900
Ship fires
Shipwrecks in rivers
Shipwrecks of the New Jersey coast